Anthemus or Anthemous, also known as Anthemuntus or Anthemountos (Ἀνθεμοῦντος), was a town of ancient Macedonia of some importance, belonging to the early Macedonian monarchy. It appears to have stood southeast of Thessalonica and north of Chalcidice, since we learn from Thucydides that its territory bordered upon Bisaltia, Crestonia and Mygdonia. The territory of the town is first mentioned when Amyntas I of Macedon offered it to Hippias, son of Athenian tyrant Pisistratus. Hippias refused it and Iolcos as well, the Thessalian offer, as Amyntas probably did not possess Anthemous at that time, but was merely suggesting a plan of joint occupation to Hippias. It was given by Philip of Macedon to the Olynthians. Peroidas commanded the cavalry squadron of Hetairoi from Anthemus in the campaign of Alexander. Like some of the other chief cities in Macedonia, it gave its name to a town in Asia. It continued to be mentioned by writers under the Roman empire.

There was also district, river, and lake named after the city. The river's modern name is Vasilikotikos.

The site of Anthemus is located near modern Galatista.

References

 Hazlitt, The Classical Gazetteer > page 36
Herodotus V, 94
Macedonian Institutions Under the Kings: A historical and epigraphic study - Page 174 by Miltiades V. Chatzopoulos 

Geography of ancient Chalcidice
Geography of ancient Mygdonia
Cities in ancient Macedonia
Populated places in ancient Macedonia
Former populated places in Greece